PHCC may refer to:

 Pasco–Hernando Community College
 Patrick & Henry Community College
 Primary health care center
 Plumbing-Heating-Cooling Contractors Association